Boys' triathlon was part of the triathlon at the 2014 Summer Youth Olympics programme. The event consisted of  swimming,  cycling, and  running. It was held on 18 August 2014 at Xuanwu Lake.

Results 
The race began at approximately 9:00 a.m. (UTC+8) on 18 August at Xuanwu Lake.

Note: No one is allotted the number 13.
Note: Romain Loop (BEL), Tyler Smith (BER) and Khaled Essam (EGY) received a 10 seconds penalty, served during run.

References 

Triathlon at the 2014 Summer Youth Olympics